Events from the year 1666 in China.

Incumbents 
 Kangxi Emperor (5th year)
 Regents — Sonin, Ebilun, Suksaha, and Oboi

Viceroys
 Viceroy of Zhili, Shandong and Henan — Zhu Changzuo
 Viceroy of Zhejiang — Zhao Tingchen
 Viceroy of Fujian — Zhu Changzuo 
 Viceroy of Huguang — Zhang Changgeng
 Viceroy of Shaanxi — Bai Rumei
 Viceroy of Liangguang — Lu Xingzu 
 Viceroy of Yun-Gui — Bian Sanyuan 
 Viceroy of Sichuan — Li Guoying, Miao Cheng
 Viceroy of Jiangnan —  Lang Tingzuo

Events 
 Zheng Jing's forces attack the Dutch at Keelung but are repulsed
 Sino-Russian border conflicts

Births 
 July 17, Cherbourg-en-Cotentin, France — Joseph Henri Marie de Prémare (1666 – 1736), Jesuit missionary, wrote the first important Chinese language grammar in a European language

Deaths 
 Jesuit missionary and astronomer Adam Schall von Bell dies in exile in Macau after release from prison. He was accused by Yang Guangxian of rebellion and miscalculating the funeral of Consort Donggo
 Fan Wencheng, early Han Chinese defector to the Qing dynasty

References

 

 
China